The boys' singles tournament of the 2010 US Open started on Sunday, September 5, the seventh day of the main tournament.

Bernard Tomic was the defending champion, but he did not defend his title as he had stopped playing junior tournaments in 2010, despite still being eligible to do so as a 1992 birth.

Jack Sock, who received a wildcard into the singles main draw, won this tournament after defeating his compatriot, tenth-seeded Denis Kudla, in the final.

Seeds

Draw

Finals

Top half

Section 1

Section 2
{{16TeamBracket-Compact-Tennis3
| RD1=First round
| RD2=Second round
| RD3=Third round
| RD4=Quarterfinals

| RD1-seed01=4
| RD1-team01= Jiří Veselý
| RD1-score01-1=7
| RD1-score01-2=6
| RD1-score01-3= 
| RD1-seed02= 
| RD1-team02= Huang Liang-chi
| RD1-score02-1=5
| RD1-score02-2=3
| RD1-score02-3= 

| RD1-seed03=Q
| RD1-team03= Mackenzie McDonald
| RD1-score03-1=3
| RD1-score03-2=2
| RD1-score03-3= 
| RD1-seed04= 
| RD1-team04=
| RD1-score04-1=6
| RD1-score04-2=6
| RD1-score04-3= 

| RD1-seed05= 
| RD1-team05= Raymond Sarmiento
| RD1-score05-1=66
| RD1-score05-2=6
| RD1-score05-3=4
| RD1-seed06=Q
| RD1-team06= Karue Sell
| RD1-score06-1=78
| RD1-score06-2=4
| RD1-score06-3=6

| RD1-seed07= 
| RD1-team07= Taro Daniel
| RD1-score07-1=6
| RD1-score07-2=6
| RD1-score07-3= 
| RD1-seed08=14
| RD1-team08= Dominic Thiem
| RD1-score08-1=4
| RD1-score08-2=0
| RD1-score08-3= 

| RD1-seed09=12
| RD1-team09= Máté Zsiga
| RD1-score09-1=5
| RD1-score09-2=4
| RD1-score09-3= 
| RD1-seed10= 
| RD1-team10= Joris De Loore
| RD1-score10-1=7
| RD1-score10-2=6
| RD1-score10-3= 

| RD1-seed11= 
| RD1-team11= Hugo Dellien
| RD1-score11-1=2
| RD1-score11-2=6
| RD1-score11-3=3
| RD1-seed12=WC
| RD1-team12= Daniel Kosakowski
| RD1-score12-1=6
| RD1-score12-2=4
| RD1-score12-3=6

| RD1-seed13=LL
| RD1-team13=

Bottom half

Section 3

Section 4

External links 
 Main Draw
 Qualifying Draw

Boys' Singles
US Open, 2010 Boys' Singles